A number of colonization societies which promoted the migration of African Americans to Africa have existed in the United States.  Thomas Jefferson was a Founding Father who promoted the racial separation of Native Americans and the colonization of African Americans to places far away from Virginia.  Jefferson was the most important early advocate of colonization.  The Reverend Samuel Hopkins of Newport appears to have originated the idea of colonization in 1770.

List of colonization societies
 Sierra Leone Company
 Maryland State Colonization Society
 African Colonization Society, (1800–1816)  Based in the state of Virginia, perhaps at Richmond
 American Colonization Society (1817-onwards) Somehow, it became intermingled with the National Colonization Society.  Samuel John Mills (1783–1818) was the founder, in conjunction with Dr. Finley 
 International Migration Society (1894–1899), founded at the behest of Bishop Henry McNeil Turner.  The IMS successfully transported three ships of African American migrants to Liberia.
 Liberia Exodus Joint Stock Steamship Company (1877–1880), sent one ship, the Azor, to Liberia at the behest of Martin Delany. 
 The National Colonization Society of America, (Founded at Washington, D.C., December, 1816-onwards)  The most successful group, it became a nationwide organization which involved many well-known Americans.  See:  American Colonization Society    
 New York Colonization Society ( ? – ? )  A group that was active in Liberia in the 1890s.
 United Trans-Atlantic Society (1885–1887) formed in Kansas City at the behest of Benjamin "Pap" Singleton.

See also
 American Colonization Society
 Ralph Randolph Gurley  
 William Jay

Publications
 Wilson, The History of the Rise and Fall of the Slave Power in America, Volume 1, (Boston, 1875)  
 Alexander, A History of Colonization on the Western Coast of Africa (Philadelphia, 1846)  
 Garrison, Thoughts on Colonization, (Boston, 1832)  
 Birney, Letter on Colonization (New York, 1834)  
 Jay (son of John Jay), An Inquiry into the Character and Tendency of the American Colonization and Antislavery Societies (New York, 1834)

References

 New International Encyclopedia 
 Miller, Floyd J. The Search for a Black Nationality: Black Colonization and Emigration, 1787–1863. Urbana: University of Illinois Press, 1975.
 Mjagkij, Nina, ed. Organizing Black America: An Encyclopedia of African American Associations. New York: Garland Publishing, Inc., 2001.  
 Pease, Jane H., and William H. Pease. They Who Would Be Free: Blacks' Search for Freedom, 1830–1861. New York: Atheneum, 1974.
 Redkey, Edwin S. Black Exodus: Black Nationalist and Back-to-Africa Movements, 1890–1910. New Haven, CT: Yale University Press, 1969.

Slavery in the United States
Pre-emancipation African-American history
African-American repatriation organizations